Judicial discretion is the power of the judiciary to make some legal decisions according to their discretion. Under the doctrine of the separation of powers, the ability of judges to exercise discretion is an aspect of judicial independence. Where appropriate, judicial discretion allows  a judge to decide a legal case or matter within a range of possible decisions.

However, where the exercise of discretion goes beyond constraints set down by legislation, by binding precedent, or by a constitution, the court may be abusing its discretion and undermining the rule of law.  In that case, the decision of the court may be ultra vires, and may sometimes be characterized as judicial activism.

In 1824, US Chief Justice John Marshall wrote the following on this subject:

Judicial power, as contradistinguished from the power of the laws, has no existence. Courts are the mere instruments of the law, and can will nothing. When they are said to exercise a discretion, it is a mere legal discretion, a discretion to be exercised in discerning the course prescribed by law; and, when that is discerned, it is the duty of the court to follow it. Judicial power is never exercised for the purpose of giving effect to the will of the judge, always for the purpose of giving effect to the will of the legislature; or, in other words, to the will of the law.

Concerns with regard to recidivism and other law and order issues have led to the introduction of mandatory sentencing. E.g. three-strikes laws and most sex offender registry laws in US are examples of laws carrying severe consequences, and which does not leave room for sentencing judges to consider the actual gravity of the offense, thus significantly limiting judicial discretion in sentencing. Introduction of mandatory minimum in criminal sentencing is often viewed as a shift of judicial power from judges to prosecutors, who are capable of affecting the length of potential sentence through their charging decision, e.g. filing charges on lesser included offense and dropping the charges carrying mandatory minimum sentences. Mandatory sentencing laws have been particularly popular among legislators in the United States. This has provoked formation of non-profit organizations such as Families Against Mandatory Minimums, Women Against Registry and RSOL to lobby for reinstatement of judicial discretion in criminal sentencing.

See also
Aharon Barak
Close case

References

Further reading
Gelsthorpe, Loraine and Padfield, Nicola. Exercising Discretion: Decision-making in the criminal justice system and beyond (Willan Publishing 2003).

Criminal law
Judiciaries
Legal doctrines and principles